Yves Mulengi Tshiumbi Bashiya (born 13 February 1987) is a professional rugby union player based in South Africa, who most recently played with the . His regular position is flanker or lock.

Career

Youth

Despite being born in Zaire, Bashiya grew up in Pietersburg in South Africa's Limpopo province. In 2004 and 2005, he represented the  side at the Under-18 Craven Week tournaments. In 2006, he joined Limpopo's parent union, the Blue Bulls and he played for their Under-19 side in the Provincial Championship. The following year, he was part of the  squad that played in the 2007 Under-21 Provincial Championship.

Falcons

He eventually made a total of five appearances in the competition. In June 2009, he played in a compulsory friendly match for the Falcons against  prior to the 2009 Currie Cup First Division season, scoring a try in a 67–20 defeat.

Eastern Province Mighty Elephants

He made a total of five appearances for the Mighty Elephants during the competition and also played in all seven their matches during the 2010 Vodacom Cup competition, also scoring his first try for the side against .

Return to Falcons

After just under a year in Port Elizabeth, Bashiya left after new coach Alan Solomons deemed his services surplus to requirements and he returned to former side the  during the 2010 Currie Cup First Division competition.

Club rugby

Bashiya then dropped down to club rugby. In 2013, Centurion finished second in the Carlton League to qualify to the 2014 SARU Community Cup. Bashiya made seven appearances in this competition and scored two tries in three matches at the finals, against Despatch and Old Selbornians.

Boland Cavaliers

Bashiya's performances in the 2014 SARU Community Cup earned him another chance at playing provincial rugby, as he joined Wellington-based side  for the 2014 Currie Cup qualification tournament.

References

Living people
1987 births
Sportspeople from Kinshasa
Rugby union flankers
Rugby union locks
Boland Cavaliers players
Eastern Province Elephants players
Falcons (rugby union) players
Democratic Republic of the Congo rugby union players
Democratic Republic of the Congo emigrants to South Africa
Tshwane University of Technology alumni